The 1964 Australian Formula 2 Championship was a CAMS sanctioned Australian motor racing title for racing cars complying with Australian Formula 2. The championship was contested over a single 30 lap, 90 mile race staged at the Lowood circuit in Queensland, Australia on 14 June 1964. It was the first Australian Formula 2 Championship.

The championship was won by Greg Cusack driving an Elfin FJ Ford Cosworth

Championship results

Notes
 Nominations: 10
 Starters: 7
 Pole position: Leo Geoghegan, 1:49.2
 Fastest lap: Leo Geoghegan, 1:47 (new lap record)

References

Australian Formula 2 Championship
Formula 2 Championship